John Victor Shea III (born April 14, 1949) is an American actor, film producer and stage director. His career began on Broadway where he starred in Yentl, subsequently winning his first major award, the 1975 Theatre World Award. Shortly after his Off-Broadway career began, Lee Strasberg invited Shea to join the Actors Studio where he spent several years studying method acting.

He made his television film debut in The Nativity (1978), alongside Madeleine Stowe. Billed alongside Helen Mirren, he starred in the noir film Hussy (1980) and the Academy Award-winning drama Missing (1982). In 1988, Shea won his first Emmy for his performance as William Stern in Baby M. Shea's subsequent films include the comedy thriller Coast to Coast (1987),  the drama Windy City (1984), the dark crime feature Small Sacrifices (1989),  the political thriller The Insurgents (2006), the Tamil language thriller Achchamundu! Achchamundu! (2009), the drama An Invisible Sign (2010), and the Finnish film The Italian Key (2011).

His breakthrough came when he was cast as Lex Luthor in the 1990s TV series Lois & Clark: The New Adventures of Superman, subsequently being cast as Adam Kane in the 2000s Mutant X series. Shea's public profile increased in 2012 after his five-year role as Harold Waldorf, Blair Waldorf's father on Gossip Girl.

Shea has been noted for his political involvement in social equity, which in 1984 led him to organize the largest peace rally in the history of the United States, garnering praise by various non-governmental organizations such as Amnesty International. In 2014, Shea announced his directorial debut with Grey Lady, released in mid-2017.

Early life
Shea was born in North Conway, New Hampshire, near where his father was teaching at Fryeburg Academy, Maine, and was raised in the Sixteen Acres area of Springfield, Massachusetts, with four siblings. His parents were Elizabeth Mary (née Fuller) and Dr. John Victor Shea, Jr., who served in the U.S. Army during World War II, fighting in the Battle of the Bulge, and who became a teacher, coach and later assistant Superintendent of Schools. Elizabeth Shea introduced John to literature, poetry, classical music, and art and urged him to study the piano.

Education
Shea attended Roman Catholic schools in Springfield, graduating from Cathedral High School, where he captained the varsity debate team and played varsity football and track. Shea studied at Bates College in Lewiston, Maine, where he earned a bachelor's degree in theatre. He performed on the varsity debating and football teams and co-edited the college literary magazine, Puffed Wheat, before graduating in 1970.

He studied acting and directing at the Yale School of Drama of Yale University under Dean Robert Brustein, gaining an M.F.A in Directing in 1973. During his time at the School of Drama, he also performed at the Yale Repertory Theatre, in the Yale cabaret with schoolmates Joe Grifasi and Meryl Streep, and studied film making with Arthur Penn, Sidney Lumet, and George Roy Hill in the film program at the Art and Architecture School.

Career

Early work and film debut 
After a directing apprenticeship at both the Chelsea Theatre under Robert Kalfin and the Public Theater with Joseph Papp, he made his Broadway debut at the age of 26 in Kalfin's production of Isaac B. Singer's Yentl opposite Tovah Feldshuh, for which he received the Theatre World Award. Yentl started Off Broadway at the Chelsea Theatre Center at the Brooklyn Academy of Music and, after a favorable reception, was moved to the Eugene O'Neill Theatre by producer and Actors Studio co-founder, Cheryl Crawford, and was later made into a film starring Barbra Streisand. After seeing his performance Lee Strasberg invited Shea to join the Actors Studio where he spent several years studying method acting. Since his Broadway debut in the mid 1970s, Shea has continued to work in Off-Broadway and Broadway theatre productions, starring in Arthur Kopit's End of the World starring with Linda Hunt and Barnard Hughes. In 1977, during his first trip to Los Angeles to get experience in front of a camera, he played guest roles in such TV series as Eight Is Enough and Man from Atlantis, and co-starred in The Last Convertible, a miniseries for Universal.

Early career: 1978–1982
He made his television film debut as Joseph in The Nativity (1978) opposite Madeleine Stowe as Mary, a biblical epic shot in Spain. His feature film debut came in Matthew Chapman's English film noir Hussy (1980), opposite Helen Mirren. His American film debut was in Constantin Costa-Gavras's Academy Award-winning Missing (1982), which starred Jack Lemmon and Sissy Spacek. The film, shot on locations in Mexico, also won the Palme d'Or at the 1982 Cannes Film Festival and helped launch Shea's international acting career.

During the early 1980s, Shea was asked to join the billed cast of Paula Vogel's Pulitzer Prize winning How I Learned to Drive along with Molly Ringwald as well as the following: Anne Meara's Down the Garden Paths, Eugene O'Neill's Long Day's Journey Into Night, the original production of A. R. Gurney's The Dining Room, Peter Parnell's The Sorrows of Stephen, Stephen Poliakoff's American Days, Theodore Mann's production of Romeo and Juliet, Philip Barry's The Animal Kingdom opposite Sigourney Weaver. Shea went on to be cast in the title role in Nancy Hasty's The Director, and, later, in Israel Horovitz's The Secret of Madame Bonnard's Bath.

Breakthrough roles: 1984–2004 
In 1984 Shea starred in Armyan Bernstein's Windy City along with Kate Capshaw. He won the "Best Actor" award at the Montreal World Film Festival in 1984.

In 1982, he co-hosted, with Kathryn Walker, the June 12th Anti-Nuclear Rally in Central Park, the largest peace rally in the history of the United States.  This rally was the subject of the 1984 documentary film In Our Hands by Robert Richer and Stan Warnow, in which Shea made a cameo appearance.

Shea made his Carnegie Hall debut playing "The Soldier" in Tom O'Horgan's 1985 production of Igor Stravinsky's L'Histoire du Soldat, with Pinchas Zukerman and Andre de Shields. That year, he also starred in a French language speaking role in Lune de miel. In 1986, he made his London West End debut starring in Joseph Papp's production of Larry Kramer's drama The Normal Heart at the Albery Theatre.

In 1987 ABC contracted a network miniseries titled Baby M, in which Shea was cast. His portrayal of William "Bill" Stern received critical acclaim and resulted in him being nominated and winning his first Emmy Award for Supporting Drama Actor. He starred in Small Sacrifices alongside Farrah Fawcett in 1989, and also in Jim Goddard's British production of Kennedy later that year, starring Martin Sheen and Blair Brown, in which Shea portrayed another Bates alumnus, Robert F. Kennedy.

In Grant Tinker's 1990 CBS series WIOU, written by John Eisendrath and Kathryn Pratt, Shea led an ensemble cast briefly before the show's cancellation.

In 1993, Shea was cast as Lex Luthor in the television show, Lois & Clark: The New Adventures of Superman. His portrayal of the DC Comics supervillain received positive reviews, but he left after the first season occasionally returning in later seasons in a guest role.

When asked about the characterization of Luthor, Shea pointed out the differences between his portrayal and that of Gene Hackman by saying:

This villain is written as a human being, and not just a one dimensional comic villain or a two dimensional comic villain, the way he might have been portrayed in the comic books or even other films. I thought he [Hackman] was brilliant, but it was a different kind of comic villain.

After leaving Lois & Clark, Shea starred in a new X-Men inspired series, Mutant X, where he was cast as Adam Kane. The show aired for three seasons before being cancelled.

In 1998 Shea co-wrote and directed the independent film Southie, starring Donnie Wahlberg, Rose McGowan, Amanda Peet, Anne Meara, Will Arnett and Lawrence Tierney. The film won the Seattle International Film Festival award for Best Film, represented the United States at the Montreal International Festival, and was distributed by Lions Gate Films. Shea appeared on Sex and the City as Dominic a month later. He also starred in the independent film The Adventures of Sebastian Cole. Shea was contracted later that year to be a reader on Selected Shorts for Symphony Space, broadcast nationwide on Public Radio International. His reading of Truman Capote's "A Christmas Memory" won AudioFile Magazines Earphones Award in 1999, as part of the anthology Selected Shorts: Classic Tales, Vol. XII.

Mainstream success: 2005–2012 
In 2005 he was cast as Trevor Lipton in Law & Order: Criminal Intent.

When casting for Gossip Girl began in 2007, Shea was asked to join the recurring cast as Harold Waldorf, Blair Waldorf's father. His portrayal of the character garnered him increased name recognition among millennials and contributed to his presence in American meme and popular culture. He was cast in Scott Dacko's 2006 political thriller The Insurgents with Mary Stuart Masterson.

Later in 2009 he was cast as Cary Ago's father, Jeffery, a recurring character on The Good Wife. He made his debut into Indian cinema with the 2009 Tamil drama Achchamundu! Achchamundu!, directed by Indo-American film director Arun Vaidyanathan, becoming the first American actor to work in a Tamil film. The film garnered widespread praise and critical acclaim.

Shea voiced the central character Sylvain in the English dub of the animated feature film Gandahar. He was cast in the 2010 American drama film An Invisible Sign with Jessica Alba.

Continued work: 2012–present 
Shea was cast alongside Lea Thompson in the 2012 romantic comedy The Trouble With the Truth. In the summer of 2013 he directed a 40th anniversary production of Edward Gorey's Dracula.

At the start of 2014, Shea appeared in Madam Secretary as Ted Graham. Later that year, he wrote and directed Grey Lady, a romantic thriller set on Nantucket, starring Eric Dane, Natalie Zea, Adrian Lester, Carolyn Stotesbury, Chris Meyer, and Amy Madigan. The independent film, produced by Beacon Pictures and shot by Andrzej Bartkowiak, had its first charity screening in August 2015. It was released on DVD and various streaming services in the summer of 2017.

In 2015, Shea joined the cast of Agent X as Thomas Eckhart. It was announced that Shea would play Dr. Marcus Eldridge in a 2016 episode of Bones.

Personal life
Shea has been married twice. He and his first wife, photographer Laura Pettibone, had one child together, Jake. He and his current wife, the artist Melissa MacLeod, a co-founder of the cooperative (X) Gallery on Nantucket, have two children, Miranda and Caiden.

Shea is the Artistic Director Emeritus of the Theatre Workshop of Nantucket, where he helped produce 40 productions.

Filmography 
According to IMDB, Shea has been in a total of 81 movies as an actor, has written, and directed two screenplays that have turned into film (Grey Lady and Southie), and has served as an associate producer on Achchamundu! Achchamundu! as well as an executive producer on his directorial debut, Grey Lady.

Film

Television

Theater

Awards and nominations

References

External links

John Shea at the Internet Off-Broadway Database

People from Carroll County, New Hampshire
1949 births
20th-century American male actors
21st-century American male actors
Male actors from New Hampshire
American male film actors
American male stage actors
American male television actors
American male voice actors
Living people
Outstanding Performance by a Supporting Actor in a Miniseries or Movie Primetime Emmy Award winners
Bates College alumni
Yale University alumni
Yale School of Drama alumni